Chen Lu was a Chinese painter in the early Ming Dynasty. His birth and death years are unknown.

Chen was born in Huiqi (會䅲, modern day Shaoxing in Zhejiang province). His courtesy name was Xianzhang (憲章) and his pseudonym was Ruyin Jushi (如隱居士). He was particularly skilled in painting plum, pine, and bamboo paintings.

Notes

References
 Zhongguo gu dai shu hua jian ding zu (中国古代书画鑑定组). 2000. Zhongguo hui hua quan ji (中国绘画全集). Zhongguo mei shu fen lei quan ji. Beijing: Wen wu chu ban she. Volume 10.

Ming dynasty painters
Artists from Shaoxing
Year of birth unknown
Year of death unknown
Painters from Zhejiang